ISYS may refer to:

 An interactive tool for in situ identification of fish and plankton in the ocean
 ISYS Search Software, a desktop and enterprise search product
 Isys, a suite of CRM software